Magnus Karlsson may refer to: 
===Magnus===
 Magnus Karlsson (guitarist) (born 1973), Swedish band guitarist
 Magnus Karlsson (speedway rider) (born 1981), Swedish speedway rider
 Magnus Karlsson (bandy) (born 1984), Swedish bandy player

See also
 Magnus Carlsson (disambiguation)